Suffield Township is one of the eighteen townships of Portage County, Ohio, United States.  The 2000 census found 6,383 people in the township.

Geography
Located in the southwestern corner of the county, it borders the following townships and city:
Brimfield Township - north
Rootstown Township - northeast corner
Randolph Township - east
Lake Township, Stark County - south
Springfield Township, Summit County - west
Tallmadge - northwest corner

Part of the village of Mogadore is located in northwestern Suffield Township. The hamlet of Suffield, a census-designated place, occupies the central part of the township.

Geographical features
Flatiron Lake Bog preserve (a  kettle hole bog formed about 12,000 years ago; maintained by The Nature Conservancy)

Name and history
Suffield Township was named after Suffield, Connecticut, the hometown of many its first settlers. It is the only Suffield Township statewide. A post office called Suffield was established in 1836, and remained in operation until 1966. In the southwestern part of the township was a settlement called Mishler, which had a post office from 1882 until 1917.

Government
The township is governed by a three-member board of trustees, who are elected in November of odd-numbered years to a four-year term beginning on the following January 1. Two are elected in the year after the presidential election and one is elected in the year before it. There is also an elected township fiscal officer, who serves a four-year term beginning on April 1 of the year after the election, which is held in November of the year before the presidential election. Vacancies in the fiscal officership or on the board of trustees are filled by the remaining trustees.

References

External links
County website

Townships in Portage County, Ohio
Townships in Ohio